The 1964 Australia Cup Final was the third Australia Cup Final, the final match of the 1964 Australia Cup. It was played at Olympic Park Stadium in Melbourne, Australia, on 1 November 1964, contested by George Cross and APIA Leichhardt. George Cross won the match 3–2 after extra time, with one goal each from Archie Campbell and two own goals.

Route to the final

George Cross

APIA Leichhardt

Match

Details

References

November 1964 sports events in Australia
Soccer in Melbourne
Australia Cup (1962–1968) finals